Longshan Temple is a Buddhist temple located on the foot of Mount Long in Anhai Town of Jinjiang, Fujian, China. The eldest thing in the temple is the statue of Thousand-armed and eyed Guanyin, which was supposed carved by ancient Indian monk Yilisha. It was transformed and expanded many times throughout Chinese history until now. There are dozens of which are built after the Ming dynasty (1368–1644). Longshan Temple is the ancestral temple of 400 Buddhist temples with the same name in Taiwan.

History

Tang dynasty
Longshan Temple was originally built between 618 and 619, at the dawn of the Tang dynasty (618–907). It initially called "Puxian Temple" and "Tianzhu Temple", more commonly known as the "Guanyin Hall". According to the temple's founding legend, there was orininally a giant camphor tree in the area, which covered the ground with thick shade and glowed at night. During the Eastern Han dynasty, an eminent Indian monk named Yīlìshā believed that it was sacred and ordered craftsmen to carve it into a statue of the Thousand-Armed Thousand-Eyed Guanyin and enshrine it within the temple.

Ming dynasty
The temple underwent restoration in 1623, during the reign of Tianqi Emperor (1621–1627) in the late Ming dynasty (1368–1644).

Qing dynasty
In 1684, in the 23rd year of Kangxi period (1662–1722) in the Qing dynasty (1644–1911), Shi Lang appropriated a large sum of money for repairing existing temple structures as well as constructing new building on the temple grounds. The temple was further expanded in 1708.

People's Republic of China
Longshan Temple has been designated as a National Key Buddhist Temple in Han Chinese Area by the State Council of China in 1983.

In May 2013, Longshan Temple was listed among the seventh group of "Major National Historical and Cultural Sites in Fujian" by the State Council of China.

Architecture

Yuantong Hall

The Yuantong Hall is the main hall in the temple. It was first built in the Sui dynasty (589–618), and the front of the hall was later repaired in the late Qing dynasty. The hall has double-eave gable and hip roof. On each end of the main ridge is a giant glazed green Chinese dragon, which known as Chiwen in Chinese architecture. There is a pair of 10-meter stone pillars with dragon patterns carved on it. The two lively dragons face each other and seem to fight against each other. This hall also houses a plaque inscribed by the Ming dynasty calligrapgher Zhang Ruitu

This hall enshrines a Ming dynasty wood carving statue of the Thousand-Armed Thousand-Eyed Guanyin. The middle two hands are in closing palm posture and other hands are either posed to form mudras or hold various different Buddhist instruments, such as vajras, sutra scrolls and dharma seals. There are several small statues of Buddha on its head.

Mahavira Hall
The Mahavira Hall is constructed with a double-eave gable and hip roof. A gilded copper statue of Sakyamuni is enshrined in the middle of the hall.

Hall of Four Heavenly kings
The Hall of Four Heavenly kings is the frontal hall in the temple, for the worship of Four Heavenly kings, namely the eastern Dhṛtarāṣṭra, the southern Virūḍhaka, the western Virūpākṣa and  the northern Vaiśravaṇa.

Bell Tower 
The Bell Tower houses a hollow wooden drum, which was carved during the Sui dynasty (581-618)

Television series
Longshan Temple was used for location filming of 2015 documentary Longshan Temple.

References

Buddhist temples in Quanzhou
Buildings and structures in Quanzhou
Tourist attractions in Quanzhou
1708 establishments in China
18th-century Buddhist temples
Religious buildings and structures completed in 1708